It is a marketing strategy defined area or subject in order to achieve (hit) a clearly defined objective or target. The idea is to fire once, identifying the best market area to enter and the marketing efforts on customers there, like aiming a rifle to hit the bull's red eye.

One to One Marketing
One to one marketing is targeting a specific group of audience and then carrying out our marketing strategies. Four trends will support the ongoing growth of one to one marketing.
 The one-size-fits-all marketing of the yesteryear is no longer relevant. Customers do not want to be treated like masses; they need to be treated like individuals as they are, with their own unique sets of needs and wants. By its personalized nature, one-to-one marketing can fulfill this desire.
 More direct and personal marketing will continue growing to meet the needs of the customers who no longer have time to spend in shopping and making purchase decisions. With the personal and targeted nature of one-to-one marketing, consumers can spend less time making purchase decisions.
 Consumers will be loyal only to those companies and brands that earn their loyalty and reinforce it at every purchase occasion. One-to-one marketing techniques focus on finding a firm's best customers, rewarding them for their  loyalty, and thanking them for their business.
 Mass-media approaches will decline as advances in market research and database technology enable marketers to collect detailed information on their customers, not just the approximation offered by demographics but the specific names and addresses. New technology offers one-to-one marketers a more cost-effective way to reach customers and enables businesses to personalize their messages. For example, MyYahoo.com greets each user by name and offers information in which the user has expressed interest.

Benefits of Rifle Approach (Market Segmentation)
Rifle marketing first identifies the target customers within a market and has its benefits like :
 By tailoring programs to individual segments, marketers can make efficient use of marketing resources. They are not wasting resources chasing customers whose needs would not be satisfied.
 A small firm with limited resources can compete very effectively in one or two market segments, whereas the firm would be stretched very thinly if it tries to cater to the entire market.
 By using product segmentation, companies can design products that closely match the needs of particular groups.
 Advertising media can be more effectively used because promotional messages and the media chosen to present them can be specifically aimed towards each segment of the market.

See also
Articles
Marketing
Mass marketing
Niche Marketing
Personalized marketing

Categories
:Category:Marketing
:Category:Niche Marketing

References

Strategic management